Mikumi National Park is a national park near Morogoro, Tanzania with an area of  that was established in 1964. It is the fourth largest in the country. The park is crossed by Tanzania's A-7 highway.

Territory
Mikumi National Park borders Selous Game Reserve on the south, the two areas forming a unique ecosystem. Two other natural areas bordering the national park are the Udzungwa Mountains and Uluguru Mountains. Malundwe Mountain is within the park, the highest of a belt of hills that run east and west through the park, connecting the Uluguru Mountains to the northeast with the Uvidunda and Udzungwa mountains to the west. Malundwe Mountain consists of three peaks along a ridge running north and south. Malundwe's south peak is the highest point in the park, reaching 1290 meters elevation.

Flora and fauna

The landscape of Mikumi is often compared to that of the Serengeti. The road that crosses the park divides it into two areas with partially distinct environments. The area north-west is characterized by the alluvial plain of the river basin Mkata. The vegetation of this area consists of savannah dotted with acacia, baobab, tamarinds, and some rare palm. In this area, at the furthest from the road, there are spectacular rock formations of the mountains Rubeho and Uluguru. The southeast part of the park is less rich in wildlife, and not very accessible.

The fauna includes many species characteristic of the African savannah. The park contains a subspecies of giraffe that biologists consider the link between the Masai giraffe and the reticulated giraffe. Other animals in the park are elephants, zebras, impala, eland, kudu, black antelope, baboons, wildebeests and buffaloes. At about 5 km from the north of the park, there are two artificial pools inhabited by hippos. More than 400 different species of birds also inhabit the park.

References

External links

Eastern miombo woodlands
National parks of Tanzania
Protected areas established in 1964
1964 establishments in Tanzania
Geography of Morogoro Region
Tourist attractions in the Morogoro Region
Important Bird Areas of Tanzania